The Fear the Future Tour was an international concert tour by American singer St. Vincent, which supported her fifth studio album Masseduction (2017). The tour started on October 7, 2017, in Los Angeles, United States and concluded on February 26, 2018 in Tulsa, United States.

Background 
After releasing her self-titled fourth studio album in 2014, Clark toured extensively during that year and 2015, entering on a hiatus of nearly two years thereafter. Even before any official announcement of the first single "New York" and the album Masseduction, on June 21, 2017, the singer announced the Fear the Future Tour, with a video titled "A Very Special Announcement" on YouTube and a press release containing the first dates in North America and Europe. 

On November 6, 2017, Clark announced a new North American leg for 2018, with mainly East Coast dates.

Set list 
The following set list was obtained from the concert held on October 17, 2017, in London. It does not represent all concerts for the duration of the tour.

First act
 "Marry Me"
 "Now, Now"
 "The Strangers"
 "Actor Out of Work"
 "Cruel"
 "Cheeleader"
 "Strange Mercy"
 "Digital Witness"
 "Rattlesnake"
 "Birth in Reverse"

Second act: Masseduction
 "Hang on Me"
 "Pills"
 "Masseduction"
 "Sugarboy"
 "Los Ageless"
 "Happy Birthday, Johnny"
 "Savior"
 "New York"
 "Fear the Future"
 "Young Lover"
 "Dancing with a Ghost"
 "Slow Disco"
 "Smoking Section"

Tour dates 

Cancelled shows

Notes

References 

2017 concert tours
2018 concert tours
St. Vincent (musician) concert tours